Air Marshal Sir Ronald Beresford Lees,  (27 April 1910 – 18 May 1991) was a senior Royal Air Force commander.

Early life
Lees was born in Broken Hill, New South Wales, the son of John Thomas Lees and Eliza Jane Moyle. He was educated at Prince Alfred's College and St Peter's College, Adelaide, and later read mathematics at the University of Adelaide.

RAF career
In January 1930, Lees joined the Royal Australian Air Force (RAAF) as a cadet at Point Cook, Victoria, and in January 1931 took up a short-service commission in the Royal Air Force (RAF). He was made Officer Commanding No. 72 Squadron in 1938 and served in the Second World War, taking part in the Battle of Britain in 1940. During the war he served as Station Commander at RAF Coltishall, as Senior Air Staff Officer at Headquarters No. 242 Group and then on the Sicily Invasion Force.

After the war, Lees became Station Commander at RAF Bassingbourn. He was appointed Air Officer Commanding No. 83 Group in 1952, Assistant Chief of the Air Staff (Operations) in 1955 and Senior Air Staff Officer at Headquarters RAF Fighter Command in 1958. He went on to be Deputy Chief of the Air Staff in 1960 and Commander-in-Chief of RAF Germany and Second Tactical Air Force in 1963 before retiring in 1966.

References

|-

|-
 

1910 births
1991 deaths
Military personnel from New South Wales
Knights Commander of the Order of the Bath
Commanders of the Order of the British Empire
Recipients of the Distinguished Flying Cross (United Kingdom)
Recipients of the Legion of Merit
Commanders of the Legion of Merit
Royal Air Force air marshals
The Few